Habiba Ghribi (born 9 April 1984) is a Tunisian middle- and long-distance runner who specialises in the 3000 metres steeplechase. She won the gold medal at the 2012 Summer Olympics, giving her country its first Olympic medal by a woman. She is also the Tunisian record holder in the event, having run 9:05.36 at the Memorial van Damme in Brussels in September 2015.

Ghribi competed at the IAAF World Cross Country Championships a number of times but found greater success on the track, winning a steeplechase silver at the 2006 African Championships in Athletics and a bronze in the 1500 metres at the 2009 Mediterranean Games. She represented Tunisia at the 2008 Beijing Olympics, finishing thirteenth in the first ever women's Olympic steeplechase race. In the 2016 Müller Anniversary Games, she won the women's 3000m steeplechase. She was voted the Best Sportswoman of 2009 by the Arabic daily newspaper Assahafa.

Career
Ghribi began her career as a cross country runner and competed in the junior race at the 2000 IAAF World Cross Country Championships at the age of fifteen, finishing in 46th place (the second best of the Tunisian team). She competed in the senior short race in 2002, finishing in 76th. Ghribi competed at the 2002 African Championships in Athletics in Radès, Tunisia and ended up in 11th place in the 5000 metres final. Ghribi won the gold in the junior race at the 2002 Pan Arab Cross Country Championships. She also went back to the junior race in 2003 IAAF World Cross Country Championships, improving to 23rd place and heading the Tunisian team to 7th place overall. After modest finishes in the World Cross Country short race in the 2004 and 2005, she switched to focus on the 3000 m steeplechase on the track instead when it became a world championship event.

Ghribi took part in her first World Championships in Athletics at the 2005 Helsinki Championships and finished eighth in her heat, not managing to qualify for the women's final but setting a personal best and Tunisian record of 9:51.49 nevertheless. She gained her first major medal in the event the following year, taking the silver medal at the 2006 African Championships in Athletics behind world medallist Jeruto Kiptum

Ghribi's next major competition was the 2008 Beijing Olympics. This was the first time that the Olympics had held a women's steeplechase competition and she greatly improved her record to 9:25.50 in the Olympic heats, but was a little slower in the final and finished 13th overall.

Ghribi competed at a number of major events in 2009, starting with her first ever long race at the 2009 IAAF World Cross Country Championships where she finished in 41st place. After this she ran in the 1500 metres at the 2009 Mediterranean Games and achieved a personal best of 4:12.37 on her way to a bronze medal. She made her second world steeplechase appearance at the 2009 World Championships in Athletics and further improved her best by a significant amount in the World final. Her time of 9:12.52 took her up to sixth place. Ghribi closed the year with a performance at the 2009 IAAF World Athletics Final results, but she failed to finish the race.

In recognition of her achievements in 2009, Ghribi topped a poll organised by the Arabic language daily Assahafa and was named as the "Best Sportswoman in 2009" in Tunisia.

In September 2015 she ran a personal best, Tunisian national record, African record and the 4th fastest time ever of 9:05.36 at the Memorial van Damme in Brussels, Belgium.

In June 2016, Ghribi was officially named the 2012 Olympic champion in the women's 3000 m steeplechase, several months after the original gold medalist, Yuliya Zaripova of Russia, was disqualified due to a doping violation. As of December 2016, Ghribi was considering legal action to recover at least $38,000 in prize money that Zaripova had received at events from which she was later disqualified.

Personal bests

All information taken from IAAF profile.

Competition record

References

External links

1984 births
Living people
Tunisian Muslims
People from Kairouan
Tunisian female middle-distance runners
Tunisian female long-distance runners
Tunisian female steeplechase runners
Olympic athletes of Tunisia
Athletes (track and field) at the 2008 Summer Olympics
Athletes (track and field) at the 2012 Summer Olympics
Athletes (track and field) at the 2016 Summer Olympics
Medalists at the 2012 Summer Olympics
World Athletics Championships athletes for Tunisia
World Athletics Championships medalists
Olympic gold medalists for Tunisia
Olympic gold medalists in athletics (track and field)
Mediterranean Games bronze medalists for Tunisia
Athletes (track and field) at the 2009 Mediterranean Games
Mediterranean Games medalists in athletics
World Athletics Championships winners